Hyaleucerea phaeosoma is a moth of the subfamily Arctiinae. It was described by George Hampson in 1905. It is found in Paraguay.

References

Euchromiina
Moths described in 1905